The 2004 Prime Minister's Cup was the second national football cup competition in Laos. The competition was won by Vientiane FC, who beat Savannakhet FC 2-1 in the final.

Format
The competition began with a regional qualifying tournament involving sixteen provincial teams from outside Vientiane. These teams were divided into four groups of four and they played qualifying matches during October and November. The top team in each group qualified for the next stage. At this stage, the top four teams from the 2004 Lao League joined. These eight teams were then split into two groups and a further round robin series of matches was played. The top two teams from each group qualified for the semi final knockout round to determine the two teams that would contest the final. The losers of the semi finals met in a third place playoff.

Qualifying round
The following regional teams took part in the qualifying round. Although there are no reported results, Savannakhet, Champassak, Luang Prabang and Bokeo qualified for the next round and apparently either Bokeo or Luang Prabang were moved to Group A following the draw.

Group A
All matches were played in Luang Namtha.

 Luang Namtha
 Oudomxay
 Huaphanh
 Phonsaly

Group B
All matches were played in Xayaboury.

 Xayaboury
 Luang Prabang
 Bokeo
 Xieng Kuang

Group C
All matches were played in Savannakhet.

 Bolikhamsay
 Khammuan
 Vientiane Province
 Savannakhet

Group D
All matches were played in Champasak.

 Champasak
 Attapeu
 Sekong
 Saravan

Group stage
The four qualifiers were drawn alongside the top four teams from the 2004 Lao League: Lao-American College FC, Lao Army FC, Vientiane FC and MCTPC FC (Ministry of Communication, Transportation and Construction). Vientiane FC, who finished fifth replaced National Public Security FC, who finished in fourth.

Group A

Results

Round 1

Round 2

Round 3

Group B

Results

Round 1

Round 2

Round 3

Semi finals

Third place playoff

Final

References

2004 domestic association football cups
Football competitions in Laos
Lao Premier League
Prime Minister's Cup